HD 27274, also known as Gliese 167, is a solitary, orange hued star located in the southern constellation Dorado. It has an apparent magnitude of 7.63, making it readily visible in binoculars, but not to the naked eye. At its current distance, HD 27274 is dimmed down by 0.05 magnitudes due to interstellar dust.

HD 27274 has a stellar classification of K4.5 Vk:, indicating that it is a K-type main-sequence star with interstellar absorption features. However, there is uncertainty behind the classification. At present it has 73% the mass of the Sun and 70% of its radius. HD 27274 is metal enriched, having an iron abundance 44.6% above solar levels. This is similar to the Sun's current age (4.6 Gyr).

References 

K-type main-sequence stars
Dorado (constellation)
Durchmusterung objects
0167
027274
019884